Macdonald Allen (born June 7, 1985) is a lacrosse player for the Colorado Mammoth in the National Lacrosse League and formerly of the Hamilton Nationals of Major League Lacrosse.  Allen was a member of the Edmonton Rush from 2007 to 2008 and the Rochester Knighthawks from 2009 to 2010. He was traded along with superstar John Grant, Jr. to Colorado for goaltender Matt Vinc.

Allen and Grant were both named to the 2011 NLL All-Star team.

After three years in Colorado, Allen was signed to an offer sheet by the Rochester Knighthawks prior to the 2014 season.

He played Junior A lacrosse from 2004 to 2006 with the Toronto Beaches of the Ontario Lacrosse Association. Allen played for four years for the Bishop's Gaiters in the CUFLA from 2003 to 2006.

Allen is currently a lawyer and practises general civil and commercial litigation at WeirFoulds LLP in Toronto.

Statistics

NLL

References

1985 births
Canadian lacrosse players
Edmonton Rush players
Rochester Knighthawks players
Colorado Mammoth players
Living people
Hamilton Nationals players
National Lacrosse League All-Stars